Shreepur is a village in Malshiras Taluka in the Solapur District of Maharashtra, India.

Geography 
It has an average elevation of 493 metres. It comes under Mahalung Panchayath. It belongs to Desh or Paschim Maharashtra region. It belongs to Pune Division. It is located 104 km towards west from District headquarters Solapur. 18 km from Malshiras. 315 km from State capital Mumbai.

Demographics 
Marathi is the local Language of Shreepur. BJP and NCP are the major political parties in this area.

History 
The present day village was originally part of the Bhor State, and called Mahalung. In 1935, Chandrashekhar Agashe started employing farmers in the village for the Brihan Maharashtra Sugar Syndicate Ltd.  He began construction for the first factory in April 1938, and finally established the syndicate's first sugar cane processing factory in the village in March 1939, selling the sugar under the trademark Shree, the village panchayat of Mahalung changed the village's official name to Shreepur.

See also 
 Bhor State

References

Bibliography

Villages in Solapur district